Kuznetsovo is a rural locality (a village) in Vereshchaginsky District, Perm Krai, Russia. The population was 48 as of 2010.

Geography 
Kuznetsovo is located 29 km west of Vereshchagino (the district's administrative centre) by road. Klyuchi is the nearest rural locality.

References 

Rural localities in Vereshchaginsky District